Maksym Vasylyovych Pokotylyuk (born 21 February 1988) is a Ukrainian professional footballer who plays as a central midfielder for Ukrainian club Obolon Kyiv.

References

External links
 Profile on Obolon Kyiv official website
 

1988 births
Living people
People from Naberezhnye Chelny
Ukrainian footballers
Association football midfielders
Polonia Bytom players
Skra Częstochowa players
FC Kramatorsk players
Stal Kraśnik players
FC Inhulets Petrove players
FC Inhulets-2 Petrove players
FC Bukovyna Chernivtsi players
FC Poltava players
FC Obolon-Brovar Kyiv players
Ukrainian First League players
Ukrainian Second League players
I liga players
Ukrainian expatriate footballers
Expatriate footballers in Poland
Expatriate footballers in Germany
Ukrainian expatriate sportspeople in Poland
Ukrainian expatriate sportspeople in Germany